Wu Guoguang (born in 1957 in Linyi, Shandong, China), is a Professor in the Departments of Political Science and History at the University of Victoria in Canada, and also the China Chair at the Centre for Asia-Pacific Initiatives. He is renowned for being a member of the central policy group on political reform during the tenure of Premier Zhao Ziyang.

Education

Wu holds a B.A. in journalism from Beijing University, an M.A. in law from the Chinese Academy of Social Sciences, and an M.A. and PhD in political science from Princeton University. He has been a sent-down youth, a factory assistant, secretary to the president of the Chinese Academy of Social Sciences, chief editor of the department of current affairs at the People's Daily, and a member of the Office for Restructuring Central Politics. From 1986 to 1987, he participated in researching and formulating the Chinese Communist Party's policy on political reform, and, as an assistant to Zhao Ziyang's political secretary, Bao Tong, was one of the drafters of the Chinese Communist Party's '13th General Meeting' report on political reform. He is intimately familiar with Zhao's thought about and efforts on behalf of political reform. Later he resigned in response to the government's handling of the Tiananmen Square protests of 1989. He was interviewed about the protests in the documentary film The Gate of Heavenly Peace.

After 1989

Wu was a Nieman Fellow at Harvard University, a Luce Fellow at Columbia University, and a Wang An Post-Doctoral Fellow at the John King Fairbank Center for East Asian Research at Harvard University. He was also an assistant and an associate professor in the Department of Politics and Administration at the Chinese University of Hong Kong, and is currently a professor at the University of Victoria, where he teaches in the Departments of Political Science and History and holds the China Chair at the Centre for Asia-Pacific Initiatives.

Publications in English
Globalization against Democracy: The Political Economy of Capitalism after Its Global Triumph, Cambridge: Cambridge University Press, 2017.
With Helen Lansdowne eds., China's Transition from Communism—New Perspectives, London: Routledge, 2016, xii + 216 pp.
China's Party Congress: Power, Legitimacy, and Institutional Manipulation, Cambridge: Cambridge University Press, 2015, xii + 368 pp.
Paradoxes of China's Prosperity: Domestic Dilemmas and Global Implications, Singapore: World Scientific, 2015, xxii + 622 pp.
Ed., China's Challenges to Human Security: Foreign Relations and Global Implications, London: Routledge, 2013, xiv + 336 pp. [paperback in 2014].
With Helen Lansdowne eds., Socialist China, Capitalist China: Social Tension and Political Adaptation under Economic Globalization, London: Routledge, 2009, xiv + 215 pp. [paperback in 2014].
With Helen Lansdowne eds., Zhao Ziyang and China's Political Future, London: Routledge, 2008, xii + 189 pp. [paperback in 2012].
With Helen Lansdowne eds., China Turns to Multilateralism: Foreign Policy and Regional Security, London: Routledge, 2008, xiv + 303 pp. [paperback in 2011].
The Anatomy of Political Power in China, Singapore: Marshall Cavendish Academic, 2005, xii + 365 pp.

References

Year of birth missing (living people)
Living people
Peking University alumni
People from Linyi
Princeton University alumni
Nieman Fellows
Columbia University people
Academic staff of the University of Victoria
Chinese political writers